Yunmen Wenyan (romaji: Ummon Bun'en; 862 or 864 – 949 CE), was a major Chinese Chan master of the Tang dynasty. He was a dharma-heir of Xuefeng Yicun.

Yunmen founded the Yunmen school, one of the five major schools of Chán (Chinese Zen). The name is derived from Yunmen monastery of Shaozhou where Yunmen was abbot. The Yunmen school flourished into the early Song Dynasty, with particular influence on the upper classes, and eventually culminating in the compilation and writing of the Blue Cliff Record.

The school would eventually be absorbed by the Linji school later in the Song. The lineage still lives on to this day through Chan Master Hsu Yun (1840–1959).

Biography

Early years
Yunmen was born in the town of Jiaxing near Suzhou and southwest of Shanghai to the Zhang family, apparently in 864 CE. His birth year is uncertain. The two memorial stele at the Yunmen monastery states he was 86 years old when he died in 949 CE, which suggests that he was born in 864 CE.

Initial Zen-studies
While a boy, Yunmen became a monk under a "Commandment master"  named Zhicheng in Jiaxing. He studied there for several years, taking his monastic vows at age 20, in 883 CE.

The teachings there did not satisfy him, and he went to the school of Reverend Muzhou Daoming (Chinese: 睦州道明; Pinyin: Mùzhōu Dàomíng), also known as Muzhou Daozong (Chinese: 睦州道蹤; Pinyin: Mùzhōu Dàozōng) to gain enlightenment. According to legend, first mentioned in 1100, he had his leg broken for his trouble:

Daoming told Yunmen to visit the pre-eminent Chan master of the day, Xuefeng Yicun of Mount Xianggu, in Fuzhou in modern-day Fujian Province, and become his disciple, as Daoming was by then too old (~100 years old) to further teach Yunmen. After a few years studying with him, Yunmen did so, and received enlightenment after several years.

Advanced Zen-studies
While Yunmen had received his teacher's seal of approval, he nevertheless did not become abbot, probably because he had only stayed there for 4 or 5 years. When Xuefeng Yicun died, Yunmen began travelling and visited quite a number of monasteries, cementing his reputation as a Chan master.

During a subsequent visit to the tomb of the Sixth Patriarch in Guangdong, Yunmen eventually joined (c. 911 CE) the monastery of Rumin Chanshi/Ling-shu Ju-min, who died in 918 CE. They became great friends. With his death, Yunmen became head priest of the Lingshu monastery on Mount Lingshu.

In this Five Dynasties and Ten Kingdoms period, the T'ang dynasty was greatly weakened, and entire sections of the empire had broken away. The South was peaceful and developed, but the "North was torn by the ravages of war". The area of Southern China where Yunmen lived broke free during the rebellion of Huang Chao, a viceroy of the Liu family. Eventually, the Liu family became the rulers of the Southern Han (918–978) kingdom during the Five Dynasties and Ten Kingdoms period. The ruler, Liu Yan, visited the monastery for Rumin's cremation (as Liu often sought Rumin's advice), and met Yunmen.

Abbot of Yunmen monastery

Impressed, Liu Yan extended him his patronage and protection, as well as confirming his appointment as the new abbot of the Lingshu monastery. But Yunmen's fame drew a great flow of visitors from all over China and even from Korea. All these visitors proved too distracting for Yunmen's taste, and in 923, he asked the king  to aid him in building a new monastery on Mount Yunmen. The king acquiesced, and five years later, at the age of 64, Yunmen began living in and teaching in the monastery on the mountain from which he took the name by which he is best known.

While the king and some of Yunmen's disciples continued to try to give Yunmen more responsibilities and honors, Yunmen refused, and returned to his monastery.

Farewell
One day, when Yunmen was 85 or 86, he composed a farewell letter to his patron, the new king of the Southern Han, and gave a final lecture to his monks, finishing with the statement:

Yunmen then sat in a full lotus posture and died. He would be buried with great honors, and his well-preserved corpse was exhumed several years later, and given a procession. In honor of this, his monastery was given a new name, and two stele erected, which recorded his biography. His corpse would be venerated until the 20th century, when it would disappear during the chaos of the Cultural Revolution.

Yunmen was succeeded as abbot by Dongshan Shouchu (Chinese: 洞山守初; Pinyin: Dòngshān Shǒuchū; Rōmaji: Tōzan Shusho; d. 900). His foremost disciple was accounted Baiyun Zixiang (Chinese: 白云子祥; Pinyin: Báiyún Zixiáng), who had founded his own temple on the nearby Mount Baiyun.

Teachings

Yunmen was renowned for his forceful and direct yet subtle teaching, often expressed through sudden shouts and blows with a staff, and for his wisdom and skill at oratory:

Yet, his teachings are also described as "difficult to understand". According to Gyomay Kubose: "Yunmen's school is deep and difficult to understand since its mode of expression is indirect; while it talks about the south, it is looking at the north."

One Word Barriers
Yunmen is known for apparently meaningless short sharp single word answers, like "Guan!" (literally, "barrier" or "frontier pass") – these were called "Yunmen's One Word Barriers". These one-word barriers

Koans

An apocryphal anecdote that began circulating around the beginning of the 12th century has Yunmen going so far as to forbid any of his sayings or teachings from being recorded by his many pupils:

Despite this, Yunmen is one of the greatest sources of "live words", "old cases", and paradoxical statements that would later evolve into the koan tradition, along with Zhaozhou (Japanese: Jōshū Jūshin). Most were collected in the Yúnmén kuāngzhēn chánshī guǎnglù (雲門匡眞禪師廣錄).

Eighteen koans in the Blue Cliff Record involve Yunmen:
A monk asked Yunmen (Ummon), "What is the teaching that transcends the Buddha and patriarchs?"
Yunmen (Ummon) said, "A sesame bun."
(From the Blue Cliff Record, case no. 77)
Eight of Yunmen's sayings are included in Book of Equanimity, and five in The Gateless Gate:
A monk asked Yunmen, "What is Buddha?"
Yunmen said, "Dried shitstick."
(From case no. 21, The Gateless Gate)

Eighteen other koans were later discovered when a subsequent master of the Yunmen school, Xuedou Chongxian (Setchō Jūken, 980–1052 CE), published his Boze songgu, which contained one hundred "old cases" popular in his teaching line, in which the eighteen Yunmen koans were included. Further examples can be found in the Jen-t'ien Yen-mu, and the Yün-men Lu.

While his short ones were popular, some of his longer ones were iconic and among the most famous koans:
{{blockquote|Yun-men addressed the assembly and said: "I am not asking you about the days before the fifteenth of the month. But what about after the fifteenth? Come and give me a word about those days."
And he himself gave the answer for them: "Every day is a good day."}}

Lineage

His disciples reputedly numbered 790, an unusual number of whom became enlightened. The Yunmen School flourished as one of the Five Schools for about 300 years, after which it was absorbed into the Linji school towards the end of the Southern Song dynasty (~1127 CE).

The lineage still lives on to this day through Chan Master Hsu Yun (1840–1959). He rebuilt the Yunmen Temple as well as Huineng's temple, Nanhua Temple. The Yunmen school continues through Master Hsu Yun, Fo Yuan, and Master Ming Zhao Shakya, who have disciples in America and abroad.

Legacy
Despite being a popular place for pilgrimages, the legendary Mount Wutai in Shanxi was ordered off-limits by Yunmen and his dharmic descendent, Linji Yixuan. When the legendary monk Ikkyū was studying under Kaso, he was assigned kōan no. 15 from the Gateless Gate where Yunmen/Ummon rebukes Tozan for wandering from one monastery to another; after being reprimanded, Tozan experiences enlightenment. When Ikkyū 'penetrated' into understanding this kōan, he was rewarded his dharma name.

The Rinzai master Shuho Myocho experienced great enlightenment after contemplating a Yunmen kōan for ten days. After the moment of enlightenment, his master Nanpo Shomyo told him: "Yesterday I dreamed that the great Ummon (Yunmen) personally came to my room. Today, it is you - the second Ummon."

By its preservation in the Blue Cliff Record, Yunmen's famous saying "Nichinichi kore kōnichi" ("Every day is a good day") became a useful phrase for later Zen teachers, including Kōdō Sawaki and his student Taisen Deshimaru. The avant-garde composer John Cage featured the saying in his Song Books as "Solo for Voice 64", specifically as a repetition of “kichi kichi kiri ko nichi”.

The shit stick kōan of Yunmen (case no. 21, The Gateless Gate) became renowned for its incomprehensibility. American Zen teacher Robert Baker Aitken explained that the term was used as "a soft stick that was used the way our ancestors used a corncob in their outhouses" Jack Kerouac paraphrased the kōan in his book The Dharma Bums as "The Buddha is a dried piece of turd." Wumen Huikai appended the kōan with the following verse:

Yunmen's Japanese name, Ummon, was the namesake for a prominent character in Dan Simmons's Hyperion Cantos science fiction series; Simmon's Ummon was a vastly advanced AI from the "TechnoCore", who reveals key plot elements to the main characters through kōans and mondo (dialogue).

See also

 Jingde (era) Record of the Transmission of the Lamp
 The Gateless Gate
 The Blue Cliff Record

Notes

References

Sources
 
 
 
 
 
 
 Sørensen, Henrik Hjort. "The Life and Times of the Ch'an Master Yūn-men Wen-yan", pp. 105–131, Vol. 49 (1996) of Acta orientalia, 
 

External links
 Zen Buddhism: An Introduction to Zen with Stories and Parables
 Ummon
 Transcription online of Pen-chi of Ts'ao-shan's Questions and Answers, as translated in Sources of Chinese Tradition'' (de Bary, Chan and Watson, ed. and trans.)

860s births
949 deaths
Year of birth uncertain
Chinese scholars of Buddhism
Chan Buddhist monks
Tang dynasty Buddhist monks
Chinese Zen Buddhists